Andaman is a 2016 Indian Tamil-language drama film written and directed by Aadhavan. The film features Richard and Manochitra in the lead roles, alongside Thalaivasal Vijay and Manobala. Produced by Sudha Movie Creations, the film was released on 16 December 2016.

Cast 
 Richard
 Manochitra
 Kannadasan
 Thalaivasal Vijay
 Nizhalgal Ravi
 Manobala
 Vaiyapuri
 Crane Manohar
 Lollu Sabha Manohar
 Chaams 
 Bonda Mani
 Nellai Siva
 Gana Bala

Production 
The film marked the directorial debut of Adhavan, an erstwhile assistant to S. P. Jananathan, while Ramani Iyer, wrote the film's songs, story, and dialogue for the project. After being launched in Chennai during April 2016, the film was largely shot in the Andaman and Nicobar Islands. A fight sequence between the lead actor Richard and the antagonist Kannadasan was shot on a ship for five days. Romantic scenes between Kannadasan and Manochitra was also shot on the boat.

Soundtrack
The film's audio launch was held at RKV Studios in Chennai on 11 July 2016. The soundtrack had four songs composed by S. P. L. Selvadasan.

Ayyo Iva - Prasanna
Kalai Malai - Gana Bala
Co Co Cola - Nincey
Anbennum Thaye - Jagadish
Jil Jil - Vaishanavi
En Vanathil - Vallavan, Vandhana

Release and reception 
The film had a theatrical release across Tamil Nadu on 16 December 2016. A critic from Iflicks noted "overall, Andaman is a film that can be watched once, adding "these actors, who are known for their acting prowess could have been utilized in a better way" and the "screenplay could have been made more racy too". A reviewer from Maalai Malar called the film "watchable" and gave the film a mixed review.

References

External links 

2010s Tamil-language films
2016 films
Indian thriller films
2016 directorial debut films